Pyramids with Nadja is a collaborative album by the bands Pyramids and Nadja.

Track listing
 "Into the Silent Waves"
 "Another War"
 "Sound of Ice and Grass"
 "An Angel Was Heard to Cry Over the City of Rome"

Credits

Pyramids
 F. Coloccia
 M. Dean
 M. Kraig
 R. Loren
 D. William

Nadja
 A. Baker
 L. Buckareff

Other
 Simon Raymonde: Bass on tracks 1 and 4
 Albin Julius: Vocals on track 4
 Chris Simpson: Vocals on track 2
 Colin Marston: Co-production, and engineering on tracks 1 and 4
 Mixed and Mastered by James Plotkin

2009 albums
Pyramids (band) albums
Nadja (band) albums
Collaborative albums
Hydra Head Records albums